The Grand Ronde Community is an Indian reservation located on several non-contiguous sections of land in southwestern Yamhill County and northwestern Polk County, Oregon, United States, about  east of Lincoln City, near the community of Grand Ronde. In the mid-19th century, the United States government forced various tribes and bands from all parts of Western Oregon to be removed from their homes and placed on this reservation. It is governed by the Confederated Tribes of the Grand Ronde Community of Oregon. In the 2000 census recorded a population of 55 persons. Most members of the tribe live elsewhere in order to find work.

Geography
Grand Ronde Reservation is located near .

Historical summary
 Since 6,000 BCE or earlier, the Rogue River, Umpqua, Chasta, Kalapuya, Molalla, Salmon River, Tillamook, and Nestucca Indians lived in their traditional homelands
 1854–1857: In the wake of the Rogue River Wars, the Grand Ronde reservation established by treaty arrangements in 1854 and 1855 and an Executive Order of June 30, 1857
 1856: Fort Yamhill built next to reservation
 1860s: Arrival of the Belgian Catholic missionary Father Adrien Croquet (renamed Crockett), uncle of the famous Cardinal Mercier, later followed by his nephew, Joseph Mercier. The non-ordained Joseph married into a local tribe, and many present-day tribespeople are among his descendants.
Most of this ends up in the hands of non-Indians.
 1901: U.S. Inspector James McLaughlin declared a  tract of the reservation "surplus" and the U.S. sold it for $1.16 per acre ($287/km).
 1936: Indian Reorganization Act enables the Tribe to re-purchase some land for homes
 1954: Under the Termination Act, the tribe's federal status was ended.
 1983: Grand Ronde Restoration Act: On November 22, 1983, President Ronald Reagan signed the Grand Ronde Restoration Act, restoring federal recognition to the people as a tribe.
 1988: Tribe regains .

Footnotes

Further reading
 C.F. Coan, "The Adoption of the Reservation Policy in Pacific Northwest, 1853–1855," Quarterly of the Oregon Historical Society, vol. 23, no. 1 (March 1922), pp. 1–38. In JSTOR.
 Melinda Marie Jetté, "'Beaver Are Numerous, but the Natives ... Will Not Hunt Them': Native-Fur Trader Relations in the Willamette Valley, 1812–1814," Pacific Northwest Quarterly, vol. 98, no. 1 (Winter 2006/2007), pp. 3–17. In JSTOR.
 Tracy Neal Leavelle, "'We Will Make It Our Own Place': Agriculture and Adaptation at the Grand Ronde Reservation, 1856–1887," American Indian Quarterly, vol. 22, no. 4 (Autumn 1998), pp. 433–456. In JSTOR.
 Ronald Spores, "Too Small a Place: The Removal of the Willamette Valley Indians, 1850–1856," American Indian Quarterly, vol. 17, no. 2 (Spring 1993), pp. 171–191.  In JSTOR.

External links
Confederated Tribes of Grande Ronde homepage
Grand Ronde Community and Off-Reservation Trust Land, Oregon United States Census Bureau

American Indian reservations in Oregon
Unincorporated communities in Yamhill County, Oregon
Unincorporated communities in Polk County, Oregon
1854 establishments in Oregon Territory
Unincorporated communities in Oregon